Bedford High School is a public school in Bedford, Ohio, southeast of Cleveland.

Background
Bedford High School was built in 1957, with additions in 1971, and 1994.  Bedford High School is accredited by the Ohio Department of Education.

Bedford High School was neighbors with St. Peter Chanel High School until Chanel High School was demolished in July 2020. With both schools winning championships in sports, The city of Bedford renamed a portion of Northfield Road the "Avenue of Champions". Both schools were under construction at the same time in the 1950s.

Bedford High School was erected in 1955-57, it is built in Norman Brick-style architecture with limestone and cost $2.1 million. The Bedford Board of Education Building at 475 Northfield Road was built on the campus in 1961 and two wings were added to the high school in 1971. They are connected to the rest of the building by two glass-enclosed walkways. The school's current football facility, Bearcat Stadium, opened in 1994.

The school once served as a potential nuclear fallout shelter. A fallout shelter sign is still visible at the front of the school building. Several underground passages exist at the school that would have served to shield the public in the event of nuclear attack.

Notable alumni
Halle Berry, actress (class of 1984)
Eric Beverly, professional football player in the National Football League (NFL) (class of 1992)
Chris Chambers, NFL player (class of 1997)
George Alec Effinger, a science fiction writer (class of 1965)
Lee Evans, professional football player in the NFL (class of 1999)
Elmer Flick, professional baseball player in Major League Baseball (MLB) and 1963 inductee into the National Baseball Hall of Fame
Tyvis Powell, professional football player in the NFL 
Toby Radloff, a minor celebrity owing to his appearances in Cleveland writer Harvey Pekar’s autobiographical comic book American Splendor
Jim Rittwage, professional baseball player in MLB
Rodger Saffold, professional football player in the NFL, and CEO of Esports organization Rise Nation  (c/o 2006)
Mary Ellen Weber, NASA astronaut (class of 1980)

State championships

 Track and Field - 1993 
 Wrestling – 1955

Notes and references

External links
 

High schools in Cuyahoga County, Ohio
Educational institutions established in 1954
Public high schools in Ohio
1954 establishments in Ohio
Bedford, Ohio